The 18th edition of the annual Hypo-Meeting took place on May 30 and May 31, 1992 in Götzis, Austria. The track and field competition featured a men's decathlon and a women's heptathlon. It was the highest level combined events meet prior to the start of the 1992 Summer Olympics in Barcelona, Spain.

Men's decathlon

Schedule

May 30

May 31

Records

Results

Women's heptathlon

Schedule

May 30

May 31

Records

Notes

See also
Athletics at the 1992 Summer Olympics – Men's decathlon
Athletics at the 1992 Summer Olympics – Women's heptathlon
1992 Decathlon Year Ranking

References
 decathlon2000
 Statistics
 decathlon2000
 decathlonfans
 1992 Year Ranking Decathlon

1992
Hypo-Meeting
Hypo-Meeting
Hypo-Meeting